Justin Hui (born 17 February 1998) is a Singaporean Chinese professional footballer who currently plays as a midfielder for Lion City Sailors FC in the Singapore Premier League, Singapore's top tier of competitive football.

Personal life 
Justin is the son of a private tutor and a teacher. He attended Holy Innocents' Primary School before attending the Singapore Sports School and Meridian Junior College. He was handed the captaincy of MJC's football team, guiding them to the 2017 A Division football title.

He was with the National Football Academy (Singapore) since Secondary 2 and later started his career with the National Football Academy Under-18 side in the Prime League.

His performance at the youth level led to him being nominated for the 2015 and 2016 Dollah Kassim Award although he did not win it.

Club career

NFA U18 

Justin started his career with National Football Academy (NFA) u-18 team in 2015. In his second season with the team, he was handed the captaincy of the team by head coach, Takuya Inoue.

Young Lions 
After impressive performances in the Prime League with the NFA U18s, he was handed a debut in the S.League for the Young Lions in September 2016, coming on as a substitute against Brunei DPMM. However, he was released from the team following the conclusion of the season.

Hougang United 
Justin then moved to Hougang United for the 2017 S.League season but was initially registered for their reserve side in the Prime League. He made his debut for the Cheetahs against Tampines Rovers, coming on as a substitute in the 61st minute before earning a shock first start in the following match against Brunei DPMM in a 2–0 defeat. Hui made his first start for the club in a Singapore Cup match, in August, against Cambodian side Nagaworld FC, playing over 80 minutes. Hui then made his first S.League start for the Cheetahs in late October 2017 against his former club, Young Lions. It proved a debut to remember for Hui as he scored the winning goal in a 1–0 victory for the cheetahs. Prior to this match, Hui had made 3 substitute appearances in the league for the club.

International career 
He was part of the 2015 Under-18 Squad for AFC Under-19 Championship qualifiers.

International Statistics

U19 International caps

U19 International goals

Honours

Individual 
 Straits Times' Young Star of the Month: May 2017, August 2017
Straits Times' Young Athlete of the Year: 2018

Career statistics 
Updated 11 Apr 2021

References 

Singaporean footballers
1997 births
Living people
Singaporean sportspeople of Chinese descent
Singapore Premier League players
Home United FC players
Hougang United FC players
Association football defenders